Zirconium(IV) iodide is the chemical compound with the formula ZrI4. It is the most readily available iodide of zirconium. It is an orange-coloured solid that degrades in the presence of water. The compound was once prominent as an intermediate in the purification of zirconium metal.

Structure
Like most binary metal halides, zirconium(IV) iodide adopts a polymeric structure.  As characterized by X-ray crystallography, the compound consists of octahedral Zr(IV) centers interconnected by four doubly bridging iodide ligands.  The Zr-I distances of 2.692 (terminal) and 3.030 Å

Synthesis and reactions
This compound is volatile, subliming as intact tetrahedral ZrI4 molecules. It is prepared by the direct reaction of powdered zirconium metal and iodine.

Pyrolysis of zirconium(IV) iodide gas by contact of hot wire was the first industrial process for the commercial production of pure ductile metallic zirconium. This crystal bar process was developed by Anton Eduard van Arkel and Jan Hendrik de Boer in 1925.

References

Iodides
Zirconium(IV) compounds
Metal halides